Tabor Home for Needy and Destitute Children, also known as the Philip H. Fretz Mansion, is a historic home located at Doylestown Township, Bucks County, Pennsylvania. It was built in 1879, and is a large L-shaped brownstone building in the Second Empire style.  It consists of a -story, five-bay main block with a mansard roof, a -story, hipped roof pavilion, and -story, library wing.  The front facade features a central three-story square tower.  It housed the Tabor Home for Needy and Destitute Children from 1913 to 1979. The organization continues as Tabor Children's Services.

It was added to the National Register of Historic Places in 1987.

References

External links
Tabor Services, Inc - Tabor Children's Services & Children’s House website
Tabor Children’s House website

Houses on the National Register of Historic Places in Pennsylvania
Houses completed in 1879
Houses in Bucks County, Pennsylvania
National Register of Historic Places in Bucks County, Pennsylvania
Organizations established in 1913
1913 establishments in Pennsylvania